West Irvine is a neighborhood in Irvine, California. It is bounded by Jamboree Road to the northwest, California State Route 261 to the southeast, and Irvine Boulevard to the southwest. Despite its name, West Irvine is located in the northern reach of the city, bordering Tustin. The neighborhood was named for its location west of the Northwood and Northpark neighborhoods. West Irvine is adjacent to The Market Place, a major shopping center in the region.

Demographics

Amenities, facilities, and neighborhoods

Neighborhoods
 Amberwood
 Barrington
 Briarwood
 Concord
 Glen Willows
 Heritage
 Ivywood
 Legacy
 Liberty
 Sheridan Square
 Traditions
 Wisteria

Governmental services
The Orange County Fire Authority is headquartered in West Irvine, sandwiched between Jamboree Road and SR-261 in a peninsula of the neighborhood's jurisdiction. OC Parks, the managing organization of Orange County's public parks, has their headquarters and a plaza of several relocated historical homes situated in the neighborhood.

Transportation
Orange County Transportation Authority serves the area with buses. Along with the neighborhood's proximity to the SR-261 toll road, Interstate 5 is on the opposite side of the adjacent Market Place shopping center.

References 

Irvine, California
Orange County, California
Villages of Irvine, California